This article lists events that occurred during 1955 in Estonia.

Incumbents

Events
 19 July – Estonian Television (ETV) began broadcasting.

Births
23 April – Urmas Ott, Estonian television and radio journalist

Deaths

References

 
1950s in Estonia
Estonia
Estonia
Years of the 20th century in Estonia